Myriam Colombi (23 February 1940 – 21 April 2021) was a French film, television and stage actress. She was theatre director of the Théâtre Montparnasse.

References

1940 births
2021 deaths
French theatre directors
Women theatre directors
French film actresses
French stage actresses
French television actresses
20th-century French actresses
People from Orne